Jon Iversen (1 December 1889 – 17 August 1964) was a Danish stage and film actor and film director.

Selected filmography 
Blind Justice (1916)
Hotel Paradis - 1931
Week-End - 1935
Frøken Møllers jubilæum - 1937
Inkognito (film) - 1937
En ganske almindelig pige - 1940
Familien Olsen - 1940
Pas på svinget i Solby - 1940
Tag til Rønneby Kro - 1941
Frøken Vildkat - 1942
En pige uden lige - 1943
Støt står den danske sømand - 1948
I gabestokken - 1950
Dorte - 1951
Det gamle guld - 1951
This Is Life - 1953
Arvingen - 1954
Vagabonderne på Bakkegården - 1958
Far til fire på Bornholm - 1959

External links
 
 

Danish male stage actors
Danish male film actors
Danish male silent film actors
20th-century Danish male actors
Danish film directors
People from Guldborgsund Municipality
1889 births
1964 deaths